Count  was a Gensui (or field marshal) in the Imperial Japanese Army, commander of the Southern Expeditionary Army Group during World War II.

Biography

Early military career
Terauchi was born in Tokyo Prefecture, and was the eldest son of Gensui Count Terauchi Masatake, the first Governor-General of Korea and the 9th Prime Minister of Japan. At the age of four, his father was transferred to France, and he was sent to live with his maternal aunt in Yamaguchi. Due to his family's close connections with former Chōshū Domain, he was officially registered as a resident of Yamaguchi Prefecture around that time. After his father returned from an overseas assignment, the family moved back to Tokyo. He graduated from the 11th class of the Imperial Japanese Army Academy in 1899, and served as a junior officer in the Russo-Japanese War with the Guards 2nd Infantry Battalion.

After the war, Terauchi returned to the Army Staff College and graduated from the 21st class in 1909. In July 1912, he was sent as a military attaché to Austria-Hungary and in July 1914 to Germany. He was promoted to lieutenant colonel in November 1916 and attached to the IJA 2nd Infantry Regiment in September 1917. He worked as several administrative posts within the Imperial Japanese Army General Staff from September 1918.

In early November 1919, he succeeded in the hereditary title of hakushaku (count) under the kazoku peerage system upon the death of his father, and was raised in military rank to colonel. In September 1920, he became commander of the 3rd Guards Infantry Battalion, and chief-of-staff of the Imperial Guard from September 1923.

As general
Terauchi was promoted to major general in February 1924 and was assigned to the staff of the IJA 1st Division in March 1926. In September 1926, the San'yō Main Line train he was riding on derailed in an accident that killed 34 people, but Terauchi was not injured.
	
In August 1927, Terauchi became Chief of Staff of the Chosen Army in Korea. He was promoted to lieutenant general in August 1929 and was assigned command of the Hiroshima-based IJA 5th Division.  In January 1932, he was transferred to the Osaka-based IJA 4th Division. He was the leading military commander in Osaka during the notorious "Go-Stop Incident", in which the verbal altercation between two young men—an off-duty soldier in uniform who had ignored a traffic light and a policeman, which developed into fistfights, and finally into a ministerial-level conflict between the Home Ministry and the Army. Terauchi demanded an official apology from the Osaka police, insisting that the policeman had unfairly injured the Army's prestige.The Osaka police refused to apologize, stating that military personnel should also observe the law. However, the Home Ministry and the Army concluded later an agreement that precluded the civilian police from handling crimes committed by military personnel, which effectively placed military personnel above the law.

In August 1934, Terauchi was transferred to command the Taiwan Army of Japan. He was promoted to full general  in October 1935.

Military-political career

After the February 26th Incident, Terauchi briefly served as interim Army Minister in March 1936 in the cabinet of Prime Minister Kōki Hirota. During his term, he began an extensive purge against the Imperial Way Faction members within the military and supported the Control Faction. His inflammatory rhetoric brought about the collapse of the Hirota administration in January 1937 when he engaged in a verbal shouting match against Speaker of the House Kunimatsu Hamada, accusing him of defaming the Army. Hamada retorted that he did not insult the Army, and would commit seppuku if it could be proven otherwise. On the other hand, Hamada said that Terauchi should commit seppuku himself if his accusation should be proven false. This clash further intensified the conflict between the military and the civilian political parties in the Japanese Diet.

World War II
In February 1937, Terauchi was appointed head of the Inspectorate General of Military Training, the third-most prestigious post in the military. With the outbreak of the Second Sino-Japanese War, Terauchi was assigned combat duty and was given command of the North China Area Army in August 1937. He was awarded the Grand Cordon of the Order of the Rising Sun in 1938.

In November 1941, Terauchi was transferred to command of the Southern Expeditionary Army Group and soon afterward began coordinating war plans with Admiral Yamamoto Isoroku for the Pacific War. After leading the conquest of Southeast Asia, Terauchi established his headquarters in Singapore. He received the  Order of the Golden Kite, 1st class, in March 1942. Promoted to Gensui (Field Marshal) on 6 June 1943, he relocated to the Philippines in May 1944. When this area came under threat from the Allied attack, he retreated to Saigon in French Indochina. Soon after receiving word of the loss of Burma by Japan, he suffered a stroke on 10 May 1945. 

As the war in the Pacific drew to a close, a British Intelligence Liaison Officer, Major Richard Holbrook McGregor, was sent by Admiral Mountbatten to Saigon to verify that Count Terauchi was indeed in a hospital and unable to make the flight to RAF Mingaladon Airfield to personally discuss terms of a cease-fire. Instead, the remaining 680,000 Japanese soldiers in Southeast Asia were surrendered on his behalf in Singapore on 12 September 1945 by General Seishirō Itagaki. Terauchi personally surrendered to Mountbatten on 30 November 1945 in Saigon.  On 12 June 1946, he suffered from another stroke at Renggam, Johor Bahru, Malaya  while being transferred to a prisoner of war camp and died. He was buried at the Japanese cemetery in Singapore.

The 2nd Count Terauchi surrendered his family heirloom wakizashi short sword to the then Lord Louis Mountbatten in Saigon in 1945. The sword dates from 1413, and is now kept at Windsor Castle. It was almost the subject of a diplomatic incident in the mid-1980s, when Queen Elizabeth The Queen Mother wanted to place it on prominent display during a dinner held for Crown Prince Naruhito of Japan. However, her daughter, Queen Elizabeth II, vetoed the idea.

War crimes
Terauchi was given command of Southern Expeditionary Army, responsible for the opening Japanese offensive of the Pacific War. He was critical of Homma for being too "soft" on  Filipinos and of Imamura for granting too much power to the Indonesian puppet government. Terauchi's attitude likely played a role in Masaharu Homma's subsequent relief and retirement. 

Terauchi thought the army should stay out of politics, by which he probably meant that the politicians should keep their hands off the army. In other respects he was a typically ruthless Japanese Army officer. Neither the Americans nor his own peers thought much of him, but his staff were impressed by the fact that such a wealthy man chose to live so frugally. Yamashita felt otherwise, writing in his diary that "... that damn Terauchi lives in luxury in Saigon, sleeps in a comfortable bed, eats good food and plays shogi". Yamashita added that: If there are two ways of doing something, trust Southern Army to pick the wrong one. 

When told that Terauchi was in too poor health to attend the surrender ceremony at Singapore, Mountbatten sent his own doctor to examine Terauchi. The doctor confirmed his fragile health, and Mountbatten had him transferred to a bungalow in Malaya in March 1946. On 11 June 1946, Terauchi became angered by a report of a Kempeitai lieutenant colonel who had threatened to disclose Japanese war crimes to the Allies, and he suffered a second massive stroke and died early the next morning. As a consequence, he never stood trial for war crimes, such as his responsibility for mistreatment of laborers on the Burma-Siam Railroad and his order that all Allied prisoners of war in his command area were to be massacred if Japan was invaded.

Notes

References

See also

External links

|-

1879 births
1946 deaths
People from Yamaguchi Prefecture
Children of prime ministers of Japan
Imperial Japanese Army generals of World War II
Japanese military personnel of the Russo-Japanese War
People of the Second Sino-Japanese War
Japanese military personnel of World War II
Kazoku
Marshals of Japan
Ministers of the Imperial Japanese Army
World War II prisoners of war held by the United Kingdom 
Japanese people who died in prison custody
Grand Cordons of the Order of the Rising Sun
Recipients of the Order of the Golden Kite, 1st class
Prisoners who died in British military detention
War criminals